Galaginakatti is a village in Dharwad district of Karnataka, India.

Demographics 
As of the 2011 Census of India there were 107 households in Galaginakatti and a total population of 466 consisting of 241 males and 225 females. There were 69 children ages 0-6.

References

Villages in Dharwad district